The France national American football team is the official American football senior national team of France.

Championships

World Games
 2005 : Third
 2017 : Winner

IFAF World Championship record

European Championships
 1983 : Fourth Place
 1985 : Fourth Place
 1987 : Did not participate
 1989 : Did not participate
 1991 : Fourth Place
 1993 : Did not qualify
 1995 : Did not qualify
 1997 : Did not qualify
 2000 : Did not qualify
 2001 : Did not qualify
 2005 : Did not qualify
 2010 : Runner up
 2014 : Third Place
 2018 : Champions
 2021 : Fourth Place

Current roster

All time results

Notes

External links
Official website

 
American Football
Men's national American football teams
1985 establishments in France
American football teams established in 1985